Sir Richard Atkinson Robinson DL (16 October 1849 – 28 April 1928) was a retail chemist and druggist, who later became a local politician and was the first member of the Municipal Reform Party (linked to the Conservatives) to lead the London County Council (1907–1908).

Early life

He was the eldest son of a Whitby family engaged in the owning and operating of sailing ships. His father died when he was 18, and with four sisters and four younger brothers, there was no money for expensive higher education.

He apprenticed himself to a chemist and druggist in Bootle, migrating to a Kensington firm in 1870 and qualifying for registration in 1872. The firm's owner died and he bought it, going on to acquire also a shop in Tunbridge Wells and later a fashionable pharmacy near St. James's Palace. 

As a chemist and druggist, he could not become a full member of the Pharmaceutical Society, but in 1898 he and others in the same position became able to do so under an amending Act of Parliament which he had actively promoted. He subsequently became a member of the society's council and served as president in 1904–1907.  He was instrumental in securing the drafting and adoption of compulsory poison regulations in 1899.

Local government

He was always active in local affairs.  He became chairman of the Tunbridge Wells Tradesmen's Association and was a Town Councillor there; an Alderman in Kensington; a Deputy Lieutenant in the County of London and a Justice of the Peace both there and in the North Riding of Yorkshire; a Governor of the Imperial College of Science; a member of the board of the Thames Conservancy; an Income Tax Commissioner, and a cofounder and first chairman of the Society of Yorkshiremen in London. He turned down the mayoralties of both Tunbridge Wells and Kensington.

He was also elected to the London County Council as one of the "Moderates" (linked to the Conservatives) who opposed the "Progressive" (linked to the Liberals) majority.  He served as Deputy Chairman of the council in 1903–04, and was leader of the "Municipal Reform Party" (the more active title assumed by the Moderates) in 1907 when, in a bitterly fought election, they won a remarkable majority against what they denounced as the Progressives' extravagance and wastefulness.  After forming the first Municipal Reform administration, he served as Chairman of the council in 1908–09.  He was knighted in 1916, the first time that (as a result of the formation of the wartime coalition government) the Conservative Party could honour the success he had helped to achieve in 1907.

Later life
During the First World War, he retired from business, serving as vice-chairman of the London Tribunal on Profiteering.  In 1920 he moved back to Whitby where he became chairman of the urban district council.

Family
In 1876 he married Jane Thistle of another Whitby family, and in 1926 they celebrated their golden wedding anniversary, as her parents and grandparents and his grandparents had done and as one of their sons and four of their grandchildren did later. He helped his children get better education than he had done and all his sons attended university or took equivalent professional qualifications, while his eldest daughter graduated at the London School of Economics and lectured there before the First World War.

Death

He died in 1928, survived by his widow, three daughters and two sons. (Two other sons predeceased him, having been killed in action during WWI.)

References

1849 births
1928 deaths
Conservative Party (UK) councillors
People associated with Imperial College London
Knights Bachelor
Members of London County Council
Councillors in Greater London
Councillors in North Yorkshire
Councillors in Kent
Deputy Lieutenants of the County of London
Municipal Reform Party politicians
People from Whitby
English justices of the peace